Cassinia thinicola is a species of flowering plant in the family Asteraceae and is endemic to coastal New South Wales. It is a compact shrub with hairy young stems, needle-shaped to slightly flattened leaves, and corymbs of up to 150 flower heads.

Description
The upper surface of the leaves is more or less glabrous, the edges are rolled under and the lower surface is densely woolly-hairy. Between 100 and 150 heads are arranged in rounded corymbs.

Taxonomy and naming
Cassinia thinicola was first formally described in 2004 by Anthony Edward Orchard in Australian Systematic Botany from specimens collected at Caves Beach in 2004. The specific epithet (thinicola) means "dune-inhabiting".

Distribution
Cassinia thinicola grows on old sand dunes and cliffs near the coast between Berowra and Forster in New South Wales.

References

thinicola
Asterales of Australia
Flora of New South Wales
Plants described in 2004